The 2013–14 Nemzeti Bajnokság I/A is the 77th season of the Nemzeti Bajnokság I/A, the highest tier professional basketball league in Hungary.

Team information 
The following 13 clubs compete in the NB I/A during the 2013–14 season:

Alapszakasz

1st tour

2nd tour

Középszakasz

Standings

Playoffs
Teams in bold won the playoff series. Numbers to the left of each team indicate the team's original playoff seeding. Numbers to the right indicate the score of each playoff game.

Team roster
4 Györgyi Őri, 6 Nóra Angerné Kováts, 7 Fruzsina Erős, 8 Dalma Iványi, 9 Daphanie Kennedy, 10 Lilla Adamecz, 12 Nóra Ruják, 13 Szidónia Katona, 20 Lucila Pascua, 21 Dorottya Győri, 22 Louella Tomlinson, 33 Nikolett Sarok and 45 Amber Holt

Head coach: Roberto Hernández

5–8 places

External links
 Hungarian Basketball Federaration 

Nemzeti Bajnokság I/A (women's basketball) seasons
Women
Hungarian